James Lasdun (born 8 June 1958) is an English novelist and poet.

Life and career
Lasdun was born in London, the son of Susan (Bendit) and British architect Sir Denys Lasdun. Lasdun has written four books of poetry, one of which, Landscape with Chainsaw, was a finalist for the T S Eliot Prize, the Forward Prize and the Los Angeles Times Book Prize. It was also selected as a TLS International Book of the Year.

In 2013 he published a memoir: Give Me Everything You Have: On Being Stalked.

With Jonathan Nossiter, Lasdun co-wrote the film Sunday in 1997, based on his story , winning both the Best Feature Award and the Waldo Salt Best Screenplay Award at Sundance. Together they also wrote the next Nossiter film Signs and Wonders in 2000, starring Charlotte Rampling and Stellan Skarsgard, selected for the official selection of the 50th Berlin International Film Festival  in 2000.

With his wife, Pia Davis, Lasdun has written two guidebooks dedicated to the combined pleasures of walking and eating: one in Tuscany and Umbria, the other in Provence.

He has taught creative writing at Princeton, New York University, the New York State Writers' Institute, the New School, Columbia University and Bennington College.

Critical appraisals of his work include reviews by James Wood in The Guardian, Gabriele Annan in The New York Review of Books and Johanna Thomas-Corr in The Observer.

Bibliography

Novels

 Paperback.
 Hardcover.

Short fiction 
Collections
 a.k.a. .

 (a.k.a. .
 Paperback.

Poetry 
Collections

 Paperback.

Nonfiction
.

Miscellaneous
 .
 .

 Paperback.
.

Honors
Winner of the Dylan Thomas Prize (short stories)
Recipient of Guggenheim Fellowship in poetry
Winner (with Jonathan Nossiter) of the Sundance Waldo Salt Best Screenplay Award for the film Sunday
Winner (1999) of the London Times Literary Supplement Poetry Competition
Winner of the inaugural BBC National Short Story Award (May 2006) for his story An Anxious Man
Fellow of the Royal Society of Literature

Notes

1958 births
Living people
English Jews
English writers
Fellows of the Royal Society of Literature
Jewish poets
People educated at Westminster School, London
The New Yorker people
English male novelists
O. Henry Award winners